Thomas James O'Donnell (born 23 October 1996) is an Australian cricketer. O'Donnell is a right-handed batsman who bowls left-arm medium. He was born in Malvern, Victoria.

He made his List A debut for the Australian National Performance Squad against India A in August 2016. He played two further matches for Performance Squad. In October 2016, he played four matches for the Cricket Australia XI in the 2016–17 Matador BBQs One-Day Cup. He plays club cricket for Essendon.

He is the son of former Australian and Victorian all-rounder Simon O'Donnell.

References

External links

1996 births
Living people
Australian cricketers
Cricket Australia XI cricketers
Cricketers from Melbourne
People from Malvern, Victoria